A-349,821 is a potent and selective histamine H3 receptor antagonist (or possibly an inverse agonist). It has nootropic effects in animal studies, although there do not appear to be any plans for clinical development at present and it is currently only used in laboratory research.

See also 
 H3 receptor antagonist

References 

Benzamides
H3 receptor antagonists
4-Morpholinyl compunds
Nootropics
4-Hydroxybiphenyl ethers
Pyrrolidines